The San Diego Barracudas were a southern Californian professional inline hockey team which existed from 1993 through 1996. The Barracudas were a part of Roller Hockey International. The team's home games were played at the San Diego Sports Arena. They relocated to Ontario, California in the 1998 and 1999 seasons, known as the Ontario Barracudas to replace the Palm Desert/Ontario Silvercats (to also represented Palm Springs, California).

Leading scorers
1993: Daniel Shank (28 goals, 31 assists)
1994: Scott Gruhl (28 goals, 33 assists)
1995: John Spoltore (14 goals, 34 assists)
1996: John Spoltore (16 goals, 48 assists)

Team records

Most goals, season: Max Middendorf, 29 (1993)
Most assists: Allen Leggett, 87
Most assists, season: John Spoltore, 48 (1996)

Most points, season: John Spoltore, 64 (1996)
Most penalty minutes: Daniel Shank & Max Middendorf, 107
Most penalty minutes, season: Daniel Shank, 107 (1993)
Most games played: Alan Leggett, 72
Most games played, goaltender: Frankie Ouellette, 70

Season-by-season record

Alumni who also played in the NHL
Ralph Barahona
Matt DelGuidice
Clark Donatelli
Scott Gruhl
Rick Vargas
Max Middendorf
Daniel Shank
Larry Floyd

Alumni who also played in European Hockey Leagues
Stefan Grogg

External links
hockeydb.com RHI portal
RHI Stats

Roller Hockey International teams
Sports clubs established in 1993
Sports clubs disestablished in 1996
1993 establishments in California
1996 disestablishments in California
Sports teams in San Diego